Albioma is an independent renewable energy producer. It is mainly active in the biomass and solar photovoltaic sectors, mainly in mainland France and the French overseas territories. It is listed on the Euronext Paris.

History 
In 1982, SIDEC (Société Industrielle pour le Développement de l'Énergie Charbon) was created by the Charbonnages de France Group to help industrialists reduce the share of hydrocarbons in their energy sources. In 1994, Séchilienne, a subsidiary of Air Liquide, acquired a stake in SIDEC's capital, and then progressively acquired a majority stake until the two companies merged in 2001 to form Séchilienne-Sidec. In 2005, Air Liquide sold its stake to Financière Hélios, which became its main shareholder (Hélios was then controlled by funds managed by Apax Partners and Altamir Amboise).

The name Albioma was adopted in 2013 by Séchilienne Sidec, in parallel with a refocusing on biomass, reducing the share of coal in its plants, and solar energy. In 2015, the Apax Partners fund put 95% of its shares in the company up for sale.

In 2012, Séchilienne Sidec bought 60% of the capital of Méthanéo, a company specialising in anaerobic digestion founded in 2007. In 2015, the company stopped developing methanisation projects because the operation of its plants was too costly due to the low quality of the agricultural waste delivered. In 2018, it sold its three operating methanisation units to the specialist company Evergaz.

The company is often confronted with strikes by its staff in thermal power plants in overseas France. Hurricane Maria cut off the connection to the Caribbean grid of some solar photovoltaic plants in 2017, but the thermal plants continued to operate.

In 2018, Impala's entry into Albioma's capital for 5% coincided with the purchase of Eneco's French branch and its 17 MW of solar capacity, notably for self-consumption.

Activities 
The group, which operates in the French Overseas Territories, Mauritius and Brazil, has been developing a partnership with the sugar industry for 20 years to produce renewable energy from bagasse, the fibrous residue of sugar cane. Albioma is also the leading producer of photovoltaic energy in the French overseas territories, where it builds and operates projects with storage.

Albioma provides more than 60% of the electricity production in Réunion, 25% in Guadeloupe and 44% in Mauritius. It is one of the leading energy producers in the French overseas departments with power plants such as Le Galion in Martinique, CTM or Caraïbes-Énergie in Guadeloupe, the Bois Rouge plant or the Gol plant in Reunion. These plants, initially coal-fired, are currently being converted to biomass, thanks to a partnership with the National Forestry Office and the use of imported wood.

Albioma is also building the first turbine running on bioethanol (the initial fuel also includes 20% light fuel oil) in 2018 (Saint-Pierre power plant).

Actionnaires 
List of major shareholders as of 9 December 2021:

References

External links 
 Official website

Electric power companies of France
Renewable energy companies of France
French companies established in 1982
Energy companies established in 1982
Renewable resource companies established in 1982